Comparettia coccinea is a species of orchid. It is native to Venezuela, Peru, Brazil and Bolivia.

References

External links 
 
 

coccinea
Orchids of South America
Plants described in 1838